Star Academy was a Bulgarian reality television show produced by the Dutch company Endemol, based on the Spanish format called Operación Triunfo. It consisted of a contest of young singers. It was broadcast on Nova Television. After the end of the season, the contestants went on tour around Bulgaria. A second season of the show was announced to start in 2007, but it was never released.

The reality show was hosted by Maria Ilieva and featured guest stars such as Sonique, Filip Kirkorov.

Star Academy Bulgaria started on April 11, 2005 on Nova Television and ended on July 18, 2005. It was produced by Global Films. The show was filmed in the former then Big Brother House. It was redecorated as an academy. The Housemates from Big Brother 2, VIP Brother 1, BB3 and VIPB2 lived there, too.

The winner of the 2005 season was Marin Yonchev (17 years old). He won 150,000 leva (about 75,000 euro).

In the 2005 season, the Students were originally 14. Later, 2 new Students entered the Academy. Here are all the participants from the 2005 season of Star Academy:
 Marin Yonchev (17) – Winner on Day 99
 Ivaylo Kolev (26) – Runner-up on Day 99
 Viktoria Arsova (22) – 3rd place on Day 99
 Vyara Pantaleeva (22) – 4th place on Day 99
 Georgi Kostov (20) – 12th evicted on Day 93
 Deyan Kamenov (21) – 11th evicted on Day 86
 Valentina Aleksandrova (19) – 10th evicted on Day 78 (She entered on Day 37)
 Daniel Georgiev (21) – 9th evicted on Day 71
 Vesela Valkova (25) – 8th evicted on Day 64 (She entered on Day 44)
 Aleksandra Ovcharova (19) – 7th evicted on Day 57
 Mariela Petrova (19) – 6th evicted on Day 50
 Dian Panov (also known as "The Joker") (18) – 5th evicted on Day 43
 Lyudmila Manolova (20) – 4th evicted on Day 36
 Klavdiya Draganova (17) – 3rd evicted on Day 29
 Nataliya Taneva (22) – 2nd evicted on Day 22
 Aksinia Chenkova (18) – 1st evicted on Day 15

Here are all the teachers from the 2005 season of Star Academy Bulgaria:
 Dimitar Stanchev – The director of the Academy
 Alfredo Tores – The choreographer
 Danko Yordanov – Music Teacher №1
 Rosi Ovcharova – Music Teacher №2
 Alis Nubar Bovarian – Music Teacher №3
 Veselin Rankov – Stage manners Teacher
 Laura Josh-Markov – English Teacher
 Anastasia Sharenkova – Choreographer

Star Academy Bulgaria Facts
 General
 Winner: 1 male
 Highest eviction percentage: Vesela Valkova, 91.2%
 Least eviction difference: Valentina Aleksandrova 51%, Deyan Kamenov 49%, Valentina evicted; Daniel Georgiev 51%, Deyan Kamenov 49%, Daniel evicted
 Older Star Academy student: Ivaylo Kolev – 26 years old
 Younger Star Academy student: Klavdiya Draganova and Marin Yonchev – 17 years old
 Shortest stay in the Academy: Aksinia Chenkova, 15 days
 Longest stay in the Academy: Marin Yonchev, 99 days
 Most saving student: Georgi Kostov, 5
 Same-Sized (Tall/Short) students: Aksinia Chenkova, Klavdiya Draganova, Dian Panov and Marin Yonchev
 2005 /Star Academy 1/
 First student to be evicted: Aksinia Chenkova 
 First replacement student: Valentina Aleksandrova 
 First Star Academy Winner: Marin Yonchev /150 000 levas/
 First student not to be nominated during the whole season: Viktoria Arsova 
 First finalists: Marin Yonchev, Ivaylo Kolev, Viktoria Arsova and Vyara Pantaleeva
 First nominations without a saved student: Georgi Kostov, Deyan Kamenov and Aleksandra Ovcharova
 First student to be evicted by the students: Deyan Kamenov
 First students nominated by the viewers: Georgi Kostov, Deyan Kamenov and Marin Yonchev
 First student to be saved from the teachers: Marin Yonchev
 First students to be nominated by the director of the Academy: Ivailo Kolev and Vyara Pantaleeva
 First replacement teacher: Alis Nubar Bovarian

External links
 Official website

 
Bulgarian television series
Bulgarian reality television series
2000s Bulgarian television series
2005 Bulgarian television series debuts
2005 Bulgarian television series endings
Bulgarian-language television shows
Nova (Bulgarian TV channel) original programming